Bergeriella is a genus of bacteria from the family of Neisseriaceae with one known species (Bergeriella denitrificans). Bergeriella denitrificans has been isolated from the oral mucosa of a rat.

References

Neisseriales
Bacteria genera
Monotypic bacteria genera